Xishan Island is a part of Suzhou It's the largest island in Lake Tai covering an area of 79.8 square kilometers. There are 72 mountains in Taihu County, with 41 of them located in Xishan Island. The highest mountain, Piaomiao Mountain, is 336.6 meters high and also belongs to Xishan Island.

The official name of Xishan Island derived from Xishan Town but on June 28, 2007, it was changed to Jinting Town.

To develop a local tourism industry, Xishan Scenic Zone was founded. There are many natural landscapes in Xishan Island, including Shigongshan, Linwudong, Mingyuewan, Baoshansi, Xiangxuehai, and so on.

Apart from these tourist attractions, Xishan Island produces plums, waxberries, oranges, loquats, and peaches.

References

Islands of Jiangsu
Geography of Suzhou
Lake islands of China
AAAA-rated tourist attractions